Endotricha luteogrisalis is a species of snout moth in the genus Endotricha. It was described by George Hampson in 1896, and is known from northern India, Bhutan and China (Fujian, Hainan, Jiangxi, Yunnan).

The wingspan is 16.5−20 mm.

References

Moths described in 1896
Endotrichini